The 1944 All-SEC football team consists of American football players selected to the All-Southeastern Conference (SEC) chosen by various selectors for the 1944 college football season. Georgia Tech won the conference.

All-SEC selections

Ends
Phil Tinsley, Georgia Tech (AP-1, UP-1)
Ray Olson, Tulane (AP-1)
Dewell Rushing, Florida (UP-1)
Ralph Jones, Alabama (AP-2)
Reid Moseley, Georgia (AP-2)
Webb, LSU (UP-2)
Well, Georgia (UP-2)
Bill Hildebrand, Miss. St. (AP-3)
Bob McCain, Ole Miss (AP-3)

Tackles
Wash Serini, Kentucky (AP-1, UP-1)
Killery Horne, Miss. St. (AP-1)
Wozniak, Alabama (UP-1)
Dub Garrett, Miss. St. (AP-2, UP-2)
Andy Perbach, Georgia (AP-2)
Little, Kentucky (UP-2)
Tom Whitley, Alabama (AP-3)
Mike Castronis, Georgia (AP-3)

Guards
Bob Dobelstein, Tennessee (AP-1, UP-1)
Herbert St. John, Georgia (AP-1)
Felix Trapani, LSU (UP-1)
Maurrice Furrhgott, Georgia Tech (AP-2)
Gaston Bourgeois, Tulane (AP-2, UP-2)
Arnette, Ole Miss (UP-2)
Tom Whitley, Alabama (AP-3)
Mike Castronis, Georgia (AP-3)

Centers
Tex Warrington, Auburn (AP-1, UP-1)
Vaughn Mancha, Alabama (AP-2, UP-2)
Russ Morgan, Tennessee (AP-2)

Quarterbacks

Shorty McWilliams, Miss. St. (AP-1, UP-1)
Harry Gilmer, Alabama (College Football Hall of Fame)  (AP-2, UP-1)
Dinky Bowen, Georgia Tech (AP-2, UP-2)

Halfbacks
Dub Jones, Tulane (AP-1, UP-1)
Buster Stephens, Tennessee (AP-1, UP-2)
Kuykendall, Auburn (UP-2)
Rutland, Georgia (UP-2)
Norman Klein, Kentucky (AP-3)
Bobby Forbes, Florida (AP-3)
George Matthews, Georgia Tech (AP-3)

Fullbacks
Frank Broyles, Georgia Tech (AP-1, UP-1 [as hb])
Billy Bevis, Tennessee (AP-2)

Key

AP = Associated Press.

UP = United Press

Bold = Consensus first-team selection by both AP and UP

See also
1944 College Football All-America Team

References

All-SEC
All-SEC football teams